At the 1991 Summer Universiade, the athletics events were held at the Don Valley Stadium in Sheffield in the United Kingdom from July 14–25. A total of 43 events were contested, of which 23 by male and 20 by female athletes.

Performances were of a high standard, particularly in the men's competition, with 6 Games records broken, with 1988 Olympic silver medalist Hollis Conway jumping 2.37 m in the high jump and home favourite Steve Backley throwing 87.42m in the javelin, both performances that remain Universiade records to this day. Future Olympic champion Derrick Adkins won the 400 metre hurdles.

The United States easily topped the medal table with fifteen gold medals and 31 medals in total. The Soviet Union won the next highest number of events, with six gold medallists, and 20 total medals. Great Britain, the host nation, came joint-third in the medal table with two gold medals and nine medals in total. Twenty-eight nations reached the medal table in the athletics competition.

Medal summary

Men

Women

Medal table

References

World Student Games (Universiade - Men). GBR Athletics. Retrieved on 2012-08-31.
World Student Games (Universiade - Women). GBR Athletics. Retrieved on 2012-08-31.

 
1991
Universiade
1991 Summer Universiade
International athletics competitions hosted by England